Red Inferno may refer to:

 Red Inferno: 1945, an alternate history World War II war novel by Robert Conroy
 Red Inferno, a DC Comics character
 Red Inferno, an alternate name for Galeona Rossa, a French-Maltese galleon captured by Murat Reis the Elder